Andropogon scabriglumis is a species of grass in the family Poaceae. It is found only in Ecuador, where it is known only from a single collection.

References

scabriglumis
Endemic flora of Ecuador
Taxonomy articles created by Polbot